The Kuopio school stabbing occurred on 1 October 2019 at Savo Vocational College in Kuopio, Northern Savonia, Finland. Armed with a sabre, 25-year-old student Joel Otto Aukusti Marin killed a female student and wounded nine others. He also carried an air pistol which was not used during the attack; it was initially mistaken for a real firearm. The attack ended when a policeman shot and wounded Marin.

Attack
The attack began in a classroom at Savo Vocational College, located in the premises of the Herman shopping mall. Students in the classroom described how Marin arrived to class with a "long bag", took out a longsword and began stabbing people. Police were alerted at 12:29. The attack lasted for at least eight minutes, during which Marin stabbed ten people. The only fatality was a 23-year-old Ukrainian-born woman who was a student at the college. During the attack, a fire was started in the building, presumably by Marin, but it was quickly extinguished. The attack ended when a policeman shot and severely wounded Marin, who was sent to the Kuopio University Hospital for treatment. The policeman was also wounded.

Perpetrator
Joel Otto Aukusti Marin (born 1994) was a student at Savo Vocational College. The police found several incendiary devices similar to a Molotov cocktail when they searched Marin's apartment after the attack. Based on preliminary information, he had no previous criminal record.

Marin had moved to Kuopio from the municipality of Siilinjärvi at some point after matriculating in 2014. He had been regularly bullied since primary school for reasons such as his clothing and being overweight. He was described as quiet and lonely. Marin had participated in shooting courses at the Kuopio Shooting Club.

Aftermath
The Finnish Parliament (eduskunta) held a minute-long moment of silence the day after the attack to honor the victims. Finnish Prime Minister Antti Rinne called the violence "shocking and completely unacceptable" and visited Kuopio on 4 October. In November 2020 the perpetrator was sentenced to life imprisonment.

References

2019 in Finland
2019 murders in Finland
Attacks in Finland
School stabbing
Mass stabbings in Europe
October 2019 crimes in Europe
Stabbing attacks in Finland
School killings in Finland